Ratskeller (German: "council's cellar", pl. Ratskeller, historically Rathskeller) is a name in German-speaking countries for a bar or restaurant located in the basement of a city hall (Rathaus) or nearby. Many taverns, nightclubs, bars, and similar establishments throughout the world use the term.

The word had been used in English since the mid-19th century, with at least one New York restaurant calling itself a rathskeller in the 19th century.

Notable examples

Germany

The Bremen Ratskeller, erected in 1405, has one of the oldest wine cellars in Germany and was a center of the wine trade in Bremen.

The  in Lübeck is one of the oldest Ratskeller in northern Germany, with parts dating to the Romanesque era. The earliest documented use for wine storage dates to the year 1220.

North America
American establishments tend to spell the word as Rathskeller to avoid similarity with the word rat.

Das Deutsche Haus Ratskeller restaurant in Indianapolis received historic landmark status. Now called the Athenaeum, it has served Bavarian fare since 1894.

The California Hall (formerly Das Deutches Haus) was built in 1912 in San Francisco and had a Rathskeller restaurant in the basement.

The Rathskeller in Boston was a famous rock and roll club from 1974 to 1997, a locus of Boston alternative rock, hosting local bands such as The Cars and Pixies as well as many other bands such as The Police and Metallica before they achieved breakthrough fame. 

The Minnesota State Capitol, completed in 1905, contains a Rathskeller that was recently renovated and restored in 2017. The Rathskeller contains 29 painted mottoes in German and was home to a full-service restaurant when it opened in 1905. Currently, the Rathskeller is home to a cafe serving legislators and the public.

Campus dining
Many universities and public institutions in the United States and elsewhere have pubs or student center dining facilities located in repurposed basements. To market these nontraditional eating locations to students and patrons, many of these are termed "Ratskeller" or some variation thereupon, including:

Binghamton University: The original SUNY rathskeller and often referred to as "The Rat".
 Boston College ("The Rat")
 Colorado State University ("The Ramskeller")
 Union College ("The Rathskeller", known as "Skeller" among students, located under The Old Chapel) 
 University of North Carolina ("The Ram's Head Rathskeller", better known as "The Rat", opened in 1948 and closed in 2008)
 University of Wisconsin–Madison ("Der Rathskeller")
 University at Buffalo (SUNY) had a facility called The Rathskeller that served food, alcohol, and occasionally had live music. It was housed in Squire Hall, and closed for good when that building was renovated starting in 1982.
 University of California, San Diego: Muir College had a facility called The Ratskeller that served food and non-alcoholic drinks. It was housed in Muir Commons, but was later replaced by the El Mercado restaurant.
 McMaster University had a student pub called The Rathskeller for over thirty years, in the basement of The Refectory dining hall. It closed in the early 2000s and was replaced with a restaurant.
 University of Florida: Built in the 1960s, the Rathskeller was a dining hall, bar and concert venue. Irish rock group U2 played their second U.S. show at this venue to a crowd of over 700 attendees in 1981. UF President Stephen O'Connell worked in the dining hall as a youth. The venue closed in 1987 after a grease fire caused extensive damage.
 Florida Institute of Technology ("Rathskeller Eatery & Convenience Store", known as "The Rat" among students)
 Oberlin College (also known as "the Rat")

See also
 Beer garden
 Beer hall
 Index of drinking establishment-related articles

References

External links

Types of drinking establishment 
German cuisine
German words and phrases